Nicholas James Tepesch (born October 12, 1988) is an American former professional baseball pitcher. He played in Major League Baseball (MLB) for the Texas Rangers, Los Angeles Dodgers, Minnesota Twins, and Toronto Blue Jays.

Career

Amateur
Tepesch was drafted by the Boston Red Sox in the 28th round of the 2007 Major League Baseball draft out of the Blue Springs High School in Blue Springs, Missouri but he did not sign and attended the University of Missouri, where he played college baseball for the Missouri Tigers baseball team. In 2008 and 2009, he played collegiate summer baseball with the Falmouth Commodores of the Cape Cod Baseball League. He was drafted by the Texas Rangers in the 14th round of the 2010 Major League Baseball draft and signed for $400,000.

Minor leagues
In 2012, while pitching for the Myrtle Beach Pelicans of the Class A-Advanced Carolina League, Tepesch and Jimmy Reyes combined to throw the second no-hitter in Pelicans history.

Texas Rangers
Invited to spring training in 2013, Tepesch won the Rangers fifth starter job. On April 9, Tepesch went  innings and gave up four hits, three walks, one run, and struck out five while getting the win in his major league debut against the Tampa Bay Rays. He ended the 2013 season with a record of 4-6 with a 4.84 ERA in 19 games (17 starts). The following season, he started 22 games for the Rangers, going 5-11 in 126 innings.

Tepesch missed the entire 2015 season with inflammation in his throwing elbow. He also underwent surgery for thoracic outlet syndrome.

He was non-tendered at the end of the 2015 season, and had previously rejected a minor league deal. However, on January 27, 2016, Tepesch re-signed with the Rangers on a minor league contract that included an invitation to spring training. On June 5, 2016, Tepesch asked and was granted his release from the Rangers.

Los Angeles Dodgers
Tepesch signed a minor league contract with the Los Angeles Dodgers on June 6, 2016. After three starts for the AAA Oklahoma City Dodgers, his contract was purchased by the major league team and he was added to the roster and called up to make a start against the Pittsburgh Pirates on June 24. He allowed five runs on seven hits in four innings to take the loss and was designated for assignment after the game.

Oakland Athletics
On June 27, 2016, he was claimed off waivers by the Oakland Athletics.

Kansas City Royals

On July 18, 2016, Tepesch was once again claimed off waivers, this time by the Royals.

Minnesota Twins
On January 11, 2017, Tepesch signed a minor league deal with the Minnesota Twins. He was released on June 7, and re-signed on June 13.

Toronto Blue Jays
On July 23, 2017, Tepesch was traded to the Toronto Blue Jays for cash considerations. He was called up from the Triple-A Buffalo Bisons on August 9 for a start against the New York Yankees where he took the loss. He was designated for assignment on September 2. Tepesch elected free agency on October 6, 2017. He signed a minor league contract with the Blue Jays on March 3, 2018, and was invited to spring training.

Detroit Tigers
On August 8, 2018, Tepesch was traded to the Detroit Tigers in exchange for cash considerations, and assigned to the Double-A Erie SeaWolves. Tepesch appeared in just 8 games for the SeaWolves before he was released on August 27.

Lincoln Saltdogs
On March 19, 2019, Tepesch signed with the Lincoln Saltdogs of the independent American Association. On August 10, 2019, Tepesch retired from professional baseball after securing a victory for the Saltdogs.

References

External links

 Missouri Tigers bio

1988 births
Living people
American expatriate baseball players in Canada
Baseball players from Kansas City, Missouri
Buffalo Bisons (minor league) players
Falmouth Commodores players
Frisco RoughRiders players
Hickory Crawdads players
Lincoln Saltdogs players
Los Angeles Dodgers players
Major League Baseball pitchers
Minnesota Twins players
Missouri Tigers baseball players
Myrtle Beach Pelicans players
Nashville Sounds players
Oklahoma City Dodgers players
Omaha Storm Chasers players
Rochester Red Wings players
Round Rock Express players
Texas Rangers players
Toronto Blue Jays players